Prajin Juntong (born 7 March 1954) is the Minister of Justice, serving until 8 May 2019, and the deputy chairman of the National Council for Peace and Order (NCPO). He also holds the post of deputy prime minister. From 2012 to 2014 he was the Commander in Chief of the Royal Thai Air Force (RTAF).

Early life and education 
Prajin attended Uttaradit School and Armed Forces Academies Preparatory School (class 13). After graduating from Royal Thai Air Force Academy (class 20) and National Defence College of Thailand (class 48). He graduated with a Ph.D. Public Administration Branch from the Institute of Public Administration, College of Public Administration Rangsit University in 2013.

Air Force career 
Prajin, served as Chief of the Air Staff on 1 October 2009, before serving as Assistant Air Force Commander on 1 October 2011. On 1 October 2012, he was promoted to commander-in-chief of the air force in 2012.

Political careers 

Later on 21 February 2014, the board of directors of Thai Airways International Public Company Limited resolved to grant Prajin, who held the position the first vice chairman of the board of directors to the chairman of the board of directors to replace Ampon Kittiampon, secretary general to the cabinet who resigned from being chairman of the board.

Prajin was appointed Minister of Transport in the government of Prayut Chan-ocha and served as deputy chairman of the National Council for Peace and Order until August 2015, was adapted to assume the position of Deputy Prime Minister responsible for the Ministry of Education, Ministry of Energy, Ministry of Information and Communication Technology and the Office of the National Research Council.

At the cabinet meeting on 13 September 2016, it was resolved to appoint Prajin as Deputy Prime Minister to oversee the Ministry of Information and Communication Technology to take charge of the position, replacing Uttama Savanayana, who had resigned from the position on 12 September 2016.

On 1 May 2018, he was appointed as the chairman of the Committee on the Management of Rehabilitation of Children and Youth.

In 2019, Prajin was appointed as senator by resigning from every position in the government.

Decorations 
 Knight Grand Cross (First Class) of the Most Exalted Order of White Elephant
 Knight Grand Cordon (Special) of the Most Exalted Order of White Elephant
 Grand Companion (Third Class, Higher Grade) of the Most Illustrious Order of Chulachomklao

References

1954 births
Living people
Prajin Juntong
Prajin Juntong
Prajin Juntong
Prajin Juntong
Prajin Juntong
Prajin Juntong
Prajin Juntong
Prajin Juntong
Prajin Juntong
Prajin Juntong